The Qijia culture (2200 BC – 1600 BC) was an early Bronze Age culture distributed around the upper Yellow River region of Gansu (centered in Lanzhou) and eastern Qinghai, China. It is regarded as one of the earliest bronze cultures in China.

The Qijia Culture is named after the Qijiaping Site (齐家坪) in Gansu Province.

Prior to Qijia culture, in the same area there existed Majiayao culture that was also familiar with metalwork. At the end of the third millennium B.C., Qijia culture succeeded Majiayao culture at sites in three main geographic zones: Eastern Gansu, Middle Gansu, and Western Gansu/Eastern Qinghai.

Research

Johan Gunnar Andersson discovered the initial site at Qijiaping in 1923. Qijia culture was a sedentary culture, based on agriculture, and breeding pigs, which were also used in sacrifices. Qijia culture is distinguished by a presence of numerous domesticated horses, and practice of oracle divination, the metal knives and axes recovered apparently point to some interactions with Siberian and Central Asian cultures, in particular with the Seima-Turbino complex. Archeological evidence points to plausible early contact between the Qijia culture and Central Asia.

Qijia culture produced some of the earliest bronze and copper mirrors found in China. Extensive domestication of horses was found at many Qijia sites.

The archaeological sites at Lajia, Huangniangniangtai, Qinweijia, and Dahezhuang  are associated with the Qijia culture. Qijia sites were also found in Ningxia  and Inner Mongolia Autonomous regions.

A total of over 350 sites of the Qijia culture have been found superimposed on the Majiayao culture. A large quantity of metal ware, mostly copper objects, including some bronzes, have been excavated from various sites in Gansu province and at Gamatai in Qinghai province.

25 pieces of metalwork were analyzed for their composition. Those made from copper were the most numerous, accounting for 64 per cent of the total. The rest represented various copper alloys, including tin.

Pottery
Techniques of pottery-making are marked by a fine red ware and a coarse reddish-brown ware. There are also a few pieces of grey ware. They are handmade, there being no evidence of wheel-made ware. While the Qijia culture pottery has its own stylistic characteristics, it also shares many traits in common with the Longshan culture in Shaanxi. Some elements of the Majiayao culture are also present.

Machang culture
Machang culture(马厂)   also flourished in 2500–2000 BC along the Yellow River; it was an outgrowth of the Banshan culture. Machang culture was partly contemporary with the Qijia; although they were quite different, there was cultural exchange between them.

Some scholars consider Machang culture as only a phase of the larger Majiayao culture; they also say that the Qijia derived from the Machang.

Mogou site
The Qijia Culture Cemetery at Mogou in Lintan County, Gansu was excavated beginning from 2008. More than one thousand graves have been found there. The area was inhabited during the first half of the second millennium BCE. Thousands of funerary goods have been found, such as pottery vessels, bone ornaments and implements, shells, and metal objects.

To date, this represents by far the biggest find of copper and bronze objects ascribed to the Qijia culture, as more than three hundred items were found here. The finds are mostly implements, such as knives, and ornaments, such as buttons, earrings and beads. Some types of objects, such as torques and armbands, were not found before.

Examination reveals that tin bronze (Cu-Sn) was the most important alloy used at the Mogou site. Other alloys, such as Cu-Sn-Pb (lead) and Cu-Sn-As (arsenic), were also in use. Some items were manufactured by casting and hot-forging.

Two iron fragments were recently excavated at the Mogou cemetery. They have been dated to the 14th century BC. One of the fragments was made of bloomery iron rather than meteoritic iron.

Late stages
During the late stages of the culture, the Qijia culture retreated from the west and suffered a reduction in population size.  Some scholars hold that Siwa culture was a descendant of the Qijia culture. Also, Kayue culture is believed by some to have developed from the western part of the Qijia culture.

See also

History of metallurgy in China
 Dadiwan culture
 Majiayao culture
 Yangshao culture
 Xishanping

References

 The Cambridge History of Ancient China : From the Origins of Civilization to 221 BC, Edited by Michael Loewe and Edward L. Shaughnessy.  
 Chang, Kwang-chih. The Archaeology of Ancient China,

External links
Qijiaping Site—history.cultural-china.com

Archaeological cultures of China
Bronze Age in China
History of Gansu
History of Qinghai
22nd-century BC establishments